Perranporth is an electoral division of Cornwall in the United Kingdom that returns one member to sit on Cornwall Council. The current Councillor is Steve Arthur, a Conservative.

A ward of the same name returned one member to Cornwall County Council between 1973 and 2009, when the council was abolished.

Cornwall Council division

Councillors

2009-2021

2021-present

Extent

2013-2021
The former Perranporth division covered the town of Perranporth, the village of Bolingey, and the hamlets of Callestick, Perranzabuloe, Penwartha, Perrancoombe, Cocks, Rose and Mount. The division covers 3,691 hectares in total.

2021-present
The current division covers the town of Perranporth, the villages of Blackwater, Trevellas, Mithian and Bolingey, and the hamlets of Callestick, Perranzabuloe, Penwartha, Perrancoombe, Cocks. The village of Wheal Rose is shared with the Redruth North division.

Election results

2021 election

2017 election

2013 election

2009 election

Cornwall County Council division

Councillors

Election results

2005 election

2001 election

1997 election

1993 election

1989 election

1985 election

1981 election

1977 election

1973 election

References

Electoral divisions of Cornwall Council